Olde Riekerink is a surname. Notable people with the surname include:

Edwin Olde Riekerink (born 1961), Dutch footballer
Jan Olde Riekerink (born 1963), Dutch footballer and manager